Miguel Flores may refer to:

 Miguel Flores (boxer) (born 1992), American boxer
 Miguel Flores (footballer), Chilean footballer
 Miguel Ángel Flores (born 1983), Honduran footballer